Nodular melanoma (NM) is the most aggressive form of melanoma. It tends to grow more rapidly in thickness (vertically penetrate the skin) than in diameter compared to other melanoma subtypes. Instead of arising from a pre-existing mole, it may appear in a spot where a lesion did not previously exist. Since NM tends to grow in depth more quickly than it does in width, and can occur in a place that did not have a previous lesion, the prognosis is often worse because it takes longer for a person to be aware of the changes. NM is most often darkly pigmented; however, some NM lesions can be light brown, multicolored or even colorless (non-pigmented). A light-colored or non-pigmented NM lesion may escape detection because the appearance is not alarming, however an ulcerated and/or bleeding lesion is common. Polypoid melanoma is a virulent variant of nodular melanoma.

The microscopic hallmarks are:
 Dome-shaped at low power
 Epidermis thin or normal
 Dermal nodule of melanocytes with a 'pushing' growth pattern
 No "radial growth phase"


Treatment
Therapies for metastatic melanoma include the biologic immunotherapy agents ipilimumab, pembrolizumab, and nivolumab; BRAF inhibitors, such as vemurafenib and dabrafenib; and a MEK inhibitor trametinib.

Prognosis 
Important prognosis factors for nodular melanoma include:

 Thickness
 Ulceration
 Sentinel lymph node (SLN) status

See also 
 Melanoma
 Polypoid melanoma

References

External links 

Melanoma